Yang Po-hsuan (born 23 August 1996) is a Taiwanese badminton player. He was part of the national university team that won the gold medal at the 2017 Summer Universiade.

Achievements

BWF World Tour (1 title, 3 runners-up) 
The BWF World Tour, which was announced on 19 March 2017 and implemented in 2018, is a series of elite badminton tournaments, sanctioned by Badminton World Federation (BWF). The BWF World Tour is divided into six levels, namely World Tour Finals, Super 1000, Super 750, Super 500, Super 300 (part of the HSBC World Tour), and the BWF Tour Super 100.

Men's doubles

Mixed doubles

BWF International Challenge/Series (1 title, 2 runner-up) 
Men's doubles

Mixed doubles

  BWF International Challenge tournament
  BWF International Series tournament
  BWF Future Series tournament

References

External links 
 

1996 births
Living people
Sportspeople from Tainan
Taiwanese male badminton players
Universiade gold medalists for Chinese Taipei
Universiade medalists in badminton
Medalists at the 2017 Summer Universiade